Jurimetrics, The Journal of Law, Science, and Technology, is a peer-reviewed academic journal published quarterly. It is the official journal of the American Bar Association's Section of Science & Technology Law and the Center for Law, Science & Innovation at the Sandra Day O'Connor College of Law. From 1959 until 1966 the journal was known as Modern Uses of Logic in Law.

See also 
 List of law journals

External links
 

American law journals
Technology law journals
Arizona State University publications
English-language journals